John Otto Lundgren (born 12 October 1968) is a Swedish dramatic baritone opera singer.

Life 
Educated at Vadstena Academy and in The Opera Academy in Copenhagen. During his studies he joined the ensemble of The Royal Danish Theatre and debuted as Schaunard in La Bohème. Since then he has frequently been singing in stagings in The Royal Danish Theatre, e.g. Enrico Ashton in Lucia di Lammermoor, Posa in Don Carlos, Amonasro in Aida, Scarpia in Tosca, Kurwenal in Tristan und Isolde, and the title role of Der Fliegende Holländer. He has continued to sing many of these roles internationally and also adding to them by singing Carlo Gérard in Andrea Chenier in Bregenzer Festspiele and Jack Rance in the Stockholm staging  of La Fanciulla del West in 2011/12. Lundgren has also sung contemporary opera. In 2005, he sang the part of Prospero in The Tempest by Thomas Adès and four roles in one and the same opera – Cecilia and the Monkey King by Reine Jönsson in Drottningholm (Sweden). In 2016 he sang Devlin in the premiere of Notorious (opera based on the Hitchcock movie with the same name) together with Nina Stemme.
In 2016 he also expanded his classical dramatic baritone repertoire by singing Wotan in Bayreuth, repeating that part in Stockholm in a single revival of the 2006 staging of Der Ring des Nibelungen directed by Staffan Valdemar Holm. In autumn 2017 John debuted at the Dutch National Opera as Simone in Eine florentinische Tragödie.

In 2018, John participated for the third consecutive year at Bayreuther Festspiele. This time in two roles, Wotan in Die Walküre and  the title role of the Flying Dutchman, Der Holländer. Later 2018 he will take part in the production of Wagner's Ring at The Royal Opera House London.

Awards 
 In 2006, John Lundgren received the Birgit Nilsson Scholarship for being one of the few Scandinavian-born dramatic baritones of his generation.
 In 2010, Lundgren was honoured Knight of Dannebrog by HM The Queen of Denmark.

Recordings 
 Puccini – La fanciulla del West (Royal Swedish Opera House, 2012)
 Händel – Giulio Cesare (Royal Danish Theater, 2007)

Repertoire 
Lundgren´s repertoire includes:

References

External links 
 Official website
Hör en längre intervju med John Lundgren

1968 births
Living people
Swedish opera singers
Swedish operatic baritones
Knights of the Order of the Dannebrog